Owzat is a 1997 CGI short film created by Aardman Animations.

Plot
IMDb explains: "It's Ghosts vs. Skeletons one night in a churchyard cricket match. At the outset, it appears that the Ghosts' bowler will best all of the Skeleton's batsmen. That is until one dandy steps up to bat and practically lays waste to the entire churchyard."

Production
The film's delivery format was Betacam SP.  The CGI animating and modelling was done using Softimage 3D.

The film was shown at the 1998 International Film Festival Rotterdam under the theme "exploding cinema", and the 1998 Holland International Film Festival under the theme "Nieuwe media".

Critical reception
On IMDb, Owzat received a rating of 5.5/10 from 70 users.

References

1997 films
1997 short films
1990s animated short films
1990s ghost films
Animated films without speech
Cricket films
1997 computer-animated films
Aardman Animations short films
Fiction about skeletons
1990s English-language films
1990s British films